Tetiana Sergeevna Omelchenko is a Ukrainian-Azerbaijani freestyle wrestler. She won the gold medal in the women's 60 kg event at the 2017 Islamic Solidarity Games in Baku, Azerbaijan. She also won a bronze medal at the European Wrestling Championships in four consecutive years: 2017, 2018, 2019 and 2020.

Career 

In 2016, she competed in the women's freestyle 60 kg at the World Wrestling Championships where she was eliminated in her only match, against Emese Barka. Barka went on to win one of the bronze medals.

In May 2017, she won one of the bronze medals in the women's freestyle 60 kg event at the European Wrestling Championships held in Novi Sad, Serbia. Later that month, she won the gold medal in the 60 kg event at the 2017 Islamic Solidarity Games held in Baku, Azerbaijan.

In 2020, she won one of the bronze medals in the 62 kg event at the European Wrestling Championships held in Rome, Italy. In the same year, she competed in the women's 62 kg event at the 2020 Individual Wrestling World Cup held in Belgrade, Serbia. In March 2021, she competed at the European Qualification Tournament in Budapest, Hungary hoping to qualify for the 2020 Summer Olympics in Tokyo, Japan. She lost her first match against Anastasija Grigorjeva of Latvia which meant that she could no longer qualify for the Olympics at this tournament. She also failed to qualify for the Olympics at the World Olympic Qualification Tournament held in Sofia, Bulgaria.

She won one of the bronze medals in the 62 kg event at the 2021 Islamic Solidarity Games held in Konya, Turkey. She competed in the 62 kg event at the 2022 World Wrestling Championships held in Belgrade, Serbia. She was eliminated in the repechage by eventual bronze medalist Luo Xiaojuan of China.

Achievements

References

External links 
 

Living people
Year of birth missing (living people)
Sportspeople from Kryvyi Rih
Azerbaijani female sport wrestlers
Ukrainian female sport wrestlers
European Wrestling Championships medalists
Islamic Solidarity Games medalists in wrestling
Islamic Solidarity Games competitors for Azerbaijan
21st-century Azerbaijani women
21st-century Ukrainian women